Raised by Humans is an album by folk artist "Spider" John Koerner, released in 1992. It was recorded live to two-track tape at Minnesota Public Radio Station Studio M, in St. Paul, Minnesota.

Reception

In his Allmusic review, critic William Ruhlmann stated, "He sings in an assured, rhythmic voice that has taken on a certain gruffness since the early days of Koerner, Ray & Glover more than 30 years ago, making it all the more appropriate to the often familiar songs and enabling him to create his own distinct interpretations. He doesn't need to make albums frequently, as long as the ones he does make are as enjoyable as this one."

Track listing
All songs traditional unless otherwise noted.
 "Prelude" – 0:23
 "Summer of '88" (John Koerner) – 5:32
 "The Young Man Who Wouldn't Hoe Corn" – 1:50
 "The Water Is Wide" – 4:21
 "Titanic" – 4:01
 "Boll Weevil" – 3:15
 "The Farmer's Curst Wife" – 2:38
 "Santy Anno" – 2:42
 "More Pretty Women Than One" (Guthrie, Koerner) – 2:34
 "Midnight Special" (Lead Belly) – 2:37
 "The Fox" – 2:41
 "Old Smoky" – 4:31
 "Everybody's Going for the Money" (Koerner) – 2:45
 "Ezekiel" – 3:29
 "Poem" (Koerner) – 0:57

Personnel
"Spider" John Koerner – guitar, harmonica (4, 9, 10), vocals
Marc Anderson – percussion, drums
Dakota Dave Hull – percussion, vocals, National steel guitar (2, 4, 5, 6, 9, 10, 14)
Willie Murphy – bass, percussion, piano, vocals
Dean Magraw – guitar (2, 8, 11, 12, 13, 14)
Peter Ostroushko – fiddle, mandolin, vocals
Dave Moore – harmonica (11, 13), percussion, accordion
John "Mr. Bones" Burrell – percussion
Production notes
Eric Peltoniemi – producer
Craig Thorson – engineer
Paul Baron – engineer, assistant engineer, post production
Linda Beauvais – artwork, design
Bob Feldman – executive producer
Tom Mudge – engineer
Marc Norberg – photography

References

External links
John Koerner discography

1986 albums
John Koerner albums